The MKS is a gas-operated, select-fire rifle of the 5.56×45mm NATO caliber and was manufactured in Sweden by Interdynamics AB. It featured a magazine insert that acted as the pistol grip similar to the Uzi submachine gun but was found uncomfortable to handle, therefore it never entered mass production.

Overview
The MKS was a gas-operated select fire rifle chambered for the 5.56 mm NATO cartridge and was capable of firing around 750/1,100 RPM.  It featured rotating barrel locking and was the first gun made by Interdynamics in 1979.  Tests in the Philippines proved the gun too uncomfortable for the average shooter to fire well and it never made it beyond the prototype stage.

See also
List of assault rifles
Wimmersperg Spz - older weapon with similar configuration

References

External links
 Modern Firearms - Interdynamics MKS

5.56×45mm NATO assault rifles
Assault rifles of Sweden
Personal defense weapons
Trial and research firearms of Sweden